Things Are Looking Up is a 1935 British musical comedy film directed by Albert de Courville, produced by Michael Balcon for Gaumont British and starring Cicely Courtneidge, Max Miller and William Gargan. It was made at Islington Studios by British Gaumont, an affiliate of Gainsborough Pictures. The film's sets were designed by Alex Vetchinsky. Courtneidge plays a dual role as the sisters Bertha and Cicely Fytte. Bertha is a dour schoolteacher, while the bubbly Cicely runs a nearby circus. When Bertha elopes, Cicely takes her place at the school to prevent her from getting the sack. It was the film debut for Vivien Leigh.

Plot

Cicely Fytte is a circus equestrienne and the twin sister of Bertha Fytte who disapproves of her. Bertha is a strict schoolteacher at a girls' boarding school and not well liked by the girls. One day Bertha elopes with a wrestler so Cicely temporarily takes her place as teacher for one day - to prevent her from losing her job. Cicely is livelier and not as disapproving as Bertha so the girls are initially surprised by Cicely's bubbly personality - unaware that she isn't Bertha. A series of comical events follow: up-beating singing in a music class (leading to the composition of the song "Things Are Looking Up"), winning a tennis match at Wimbledon (despite not having as much experience as Bertha and breaking a racket) and trying to teach geometry (despite not knowing the subject). In spite of her unorthodox methods, she becomes successful and by the time Bertha (having been shortlisted to succeed the retiring headmistress) returns, she becomes headmistress. As soon as Bertha comes back to the school, Cicely leaves with the music teacher, Van Gaard in his car and they sing their song from the music lesson Cicely covered - Things Are Looking Up.

Cast

 Cicely Courtneidge as Cicely Fytte / Bertha Fytte  
 Max Miller as Joey  
 William Gargan as Van Gaard 
 Mary Lawson as Mary Fytte 
 Mark Lester as Chairman  
 Henrietta Watson as Miss McTavish  
 Cicely Oates as Miss Crabbe  
 Judy Kelly as Opal  
 Dick Henderson as Mr. Money 
 Dickie Henderson as Mr. Money's Son  (billed as Dick Henderson Jr.)
 Charles Mortimer as Harry 
 Hay Plumb as Tennis Umpire  
 Danny Green as Big Black Fox  
 Suzanne Lenglen as Madame Bombardier 
 Vivien Leigh as Schoolgirl (uncredited)
 Alma Taylor as Schoolmistress (uncredited)
 Wyn Weaver as Governor (uncredited)
 Ian Wilson as Drummer in Band (uncredited)

Critical reception
TV Guide called the film a "quite good comedy," and rated it two out of four stars. David Quinlan describes the film as a comedy dominated by Cicely Courtneidge.

Halliwell's Film & Video Guide described the film as a "[lively] star vehicle for an oddly matched team."

References

Bibliography
Cook, Pam. (1997). Gainsborough Pictures. Performing Arts
Howard Reid, John. (2005). Hollywood's Miracles of Entertainment. Lulu.com  
Quinlan, David. (1984). British Sound Films: The Studio Years 1928-1959. Batsford
Walker, John. (ed). (1998). Halliwell's Film & Video Guide 1998. HarperCollins Entertainment. 13th edition
Wood, Linda. (1986). British Films, 1927–1939. British Film Institute

External links
 
 Things Are Looking Up Britmovie | Home of British Films
 Things Are Looking Up BFI
 Things Are Looking Up Park Circus
 Things Are Looking Up Rotten Tomatoes

1935 films
1935 musical comedy films
British musical comedy films
Films set in England
Islington Studios films
Films directed by Albert de Courville
Films produced by Herbert Mason
Films produced by Michael Balcon
British black-and-white films
1930s English-language films
1930s British films